Flashback! Rock Classics of the '70s is a charity album. This compilation is filled with the names of artists who rarely agree to allow their songs to appear on compilations. Released through Realm Records, it benefits the T.J. Martell Foundation, which contributes money to cancer and AIDS research. These tracks come from five of the six major labels of the day, BMG being the exception.

Track listing

Band credits
Deep Purple appear courtesy of Warner Brothers Records.
The Allman Brothers Band and Eric Clapton appear courtesy of PolyGram Records.
Bruce Springsteen appears courtesy of Columbia Records.
Pink Floyd appear courtesy of Capitol Records.
Cheap Trick appear courtesy of Epic Records.
Bad Company, Foreigner and Stephen Stills appear courtesy of Atlantic Records.
Kansas appear courtesy of CBS Associated Records.
The Cars appear courtesy of Elektra Records.
Lynyrd Skynyrd appear courtesy of MCA Records.

Production
Compilation Producer: Marshall Wilcoxen
Art Director: Chris Thompson
Package design: Jeff Dilena
Photography: Steve Halin
Special thanks: Charles Zelebski

Information for band credits and production were taken from the album's liner notes.

References

1991 compilation albums
Rock compilation albums